John Hamdi Eren (born 15 March 1964) is an Australian politician. He has been a Labor Party member of the Parliament of Victoria since 2002, representing Geelong Province in the Legislative Council from 2002 to 2006, and Lara in the Legislative Assembly since 2006. Eren was the Minister for Tourism and Major Events, Minister for Sport and Minister for Veterans' Affairs in the First Andrews Ministry between December 2014 and December 2018.

Early years

Eren was born in İzmir, Turkey. He came to Australia with his family (Father was a skilled migrant; fitter and turner) in 1970 and studied at a high school in the northern suburbs of Melbourne. Prior to entering Parliament, Eren worked in a variety of fields with the most prominent being on the assembly line at Ford in Geelong. At 21, Eren became the shop steward at Ford for the Vehicle Builders Union representing workers on the shop floor.

After Eren's time at Ford he was an electorate officer for Kelvin Thomson the Federal Member for Wills for over five years. Eren was elected as the State Member for Geelong Province in 2002.

Political career
Eren was elected to the Legislative Council from 2002 to 2006 representing the Geelong Province. In 2006 he was elected to the Legislative Assembly as the Member for Lara and re-elected in 2010.  In his first term in Parliament, John was a member of the Road Safety Committee and become the chair from 2007 to 2010. Eren has been a part of other committees including the Rural and Regional Committee and the Scrutiny of Acts and Regulations Committee. In 2011 Eren was elevated as the parliamentary secretary to the Deputy Leader of the Opposition. Eren was Minister for Tourism and Major Events, Minister for Sport and Minister for Veterans' Affairs in the First Andrews Ministry, but was not included in the Second Andrews Ministry since 2018.

References

External links
 Parliamentary voting record of John Eren at Victorian Parliament Tracker

|-

1964 births
Living people
Australian Labor Party members of the Parliament of Victoria
Members of the Victorian Legislative Council
Members of the Victorian Legislative Assembly
People from İzmir
Politicians from Melbourne
Turkish emigrants to Australia
21st-century Australian politicians
Labor Right politicians
Politicians from Geelong